Roseivirga echinicomitans is a Gram-negative, strictly aerobic and chemoorganotrophic bacterium from the genus of Roseivirga.

References

Cytophagia
Bacteria described in 2006